Macau competed at the 2017 Asian Indoor and Martial Arts Games from 17 to 27 September 2017. Macau sent a delegation consisting of 35 competitors for the multi-sport event.

Macau claimed its only medal (bronze medal) in the dancesport event.

Participants

Medallists

References 

Nations at the 2017 Asian Indoor and Martial Arts Games
2017 in Macau sport